Texas Tech University at Amarillo, located in Amarillo, Texas, is an official off campus teaching site of Lubbock-based Texas Tech University.  It hosts master's degrees in systems and engineering management and manufacturing and engineering through both on-site and online courses as part of Texas Tech's Department of Industrial Engineering.

External links
 Texas Tech University at Amarillo Official Site

Amarillo
Texas Tech University at Amarillo
Texas Tech University at Amarillo
Educational institutions in the United States with year of establishment missing
Texas Tech University at Amarillo